Movat's stain is a pentachrome stain originally developed by Henry Zoltan Movat (1923–1995), a Hungarian-Canadian Pathologist in Toronto in 1955 to highlight the various constituents of connective tissue, especially cardiovascular tissue, by five colors in a single stained slide. In 1972, H. K. Russell, Jr. modified the technique so as to reduce the time for staining and to increase the consistency and reliability of the staining.

Principle

The modified Russel-Movat staining highlights a lot of tissue components in histological slides. It is obtained by a mix of five stains: alcian blue, Verhoeff 
hematoxylin, crocein scarlet combined with acidic fuchsine and saffron. At pH 2.5, alcian blue is fixed by electrostatic binding with the acidic mucopolysaccharides. The Verhoeff hematoxylin has a high affinity for nuclei and elastin fibers, negatively charged. The combination of crocein scarlet with acidic fuchsine stains acidophilic tissue components in red. Then, collagen and reticulin fibers are unstained by a reaction with phosphotungstic acid and stained in yellow by saffron.

Uses

Modified Russel-Movat staining is used to study the heart, blood vessels and connective tissues. It can also be used to diagnose vascular and lung diseases.

Gallery

References

See also
Cardiovascular disease

Staining